The 1986 FIVB Women's World Championship was the tenth edition of the tournament, organised by the world's governing body, the FIVB. It was held from 2 to 13 September 1986 in Czechoslovakia.

Teams

Group A
 
 
 
 

Group B
 
 
 
 

Group C
 
 
 
 

Group D

Squads

Results

First round

Pool A
Location: Žilina

|}

|}

Pool B
Location: Plzeň

|}

|}

Pool C
Location: Brno

|}

|}

Pool D
Location: Olomouc

|}

|}

Second round
The results and the points of the matches between the same teams that were already played during the first round are taken into account for the second round.

1st–12th pools

Pool E
Location: Ostrava

|}

|}

Pool F
Location: Prague

|}

|}

13th–16th places
Location: Plzeň

|}

|}

Final round

9th–12th places

9th–12th semifinals

|}

11th place match

|}

9th place match

|}

5th–8th places

5th–8th semifinals

|}

7th place match

|}

5th place match

|}

Finals

Semifinals

|}

3rd place match

|}

Final

|}

Final standing

Awards

 Most Valuable Player
  Yang Xilan
 Best Scorer
  Yang Xilan

 Best Blocker
  Valentina Ogienko
 Best Defender
  Denisse Fajardo

External links
 Federation Internationale de Volleyball
 Peru info

W
FIVB Women's World Championship
V
V
FIVB Volleyball Women's World Championship
September 1986 sports events in Europe
1980s in Prague
Women's volleyball in Czechoslovakia